Fall into Darkness is a 1996 television movie based on the young adult novel by Christopher Pike, who also executive-produced. The film stars Tatyana M. Ali, Jonathan Brandis, Charlotte Ross and Sean Murray. It originally aired on NBC on November 25, 1996.

Plot
Sharon McKay (Tatyana M. Ali) meets Jerry (Sean Murray) and his sister Ann Price (Charlotte Ross). After Sharon turns down Jerry, he falls into a state of depression, gets drunk, and wanders onto some train tracks and is killed. Ann believes Sharon is responsible for Jerry's death. Ann decides to frame Sharon for her (Ann's) murder with the help of her friend Paul. Things go as planned on the hiking trip that Sharon, Ann and several of their friends attend, as Sharon then is accused of Ann's murder, but Ann never resurfaces and it seems nothing is as it appears to be.

Cast
 Tatyana M. Ali as Sharon McKay
 Charlotte Ross as Ann Price
 Jonathan Brandis as Chad Lear
 Paul Scherrer as Paul Lear
 Sean Murray as Jerry Price
 Alan Morgan as Mr. Renquist
 Jason Nash as Evan Clark
 Danielle Nicolet as Tracey
 Benjamin Ratner as John Richmond
 Marco Sanchez as Nico
 Ted Bradford as Minister

DVD release
Fall into Darkness was released on all-region DVD on October 22, 2001.

External links
 

1996 television films
1996 films
1990s thriller films
Films based on American novels
Films based on thriller novels
American teen films
NBC network original films
American thriller television films
1990s English-language films
Films directed by Mark Sobel
1990s American films